It's About Time is the first solo album released by session drummer Manu Katché. The musicians on the album are people Katché worked with on projects with Sting, Peter Gabriel, and others.

Track listing

Personnel 

 Manu Katché – drums, percussion, vocals (lead & background), programming, producer
 Pino Palladino - bass
 Daniel Lanois - guitar
 David Rhodes - guitar, vocals
 Dominic Miller - guitar
 Maz Roberts - vocals
 Peter Gabriel - vocals
 Richard Galliano - accordion
 David Sancious - keyboards
 Roger Bolton - keyboards
 Simon Clark - keyboards, organ
 Branford Marsalis – saxophone
 Stuart Brooks - horn
 Guy Barker - horn
 Pete Beachill - horn
 Philip Todd - horn
 Sting - vocals
 Siobhan Maher - vocals 
 River City People - vocals

References 

1992 albums
Manu Katché albums